Lola Naymark (born 5 April 1987) is a French film and television actress, writer and director.  In 2005 she was nominated for the César Award for Most Promising Actress for her role in A Common Thread but lost to Sara Forestier.

Selected filmography
 Riches, belles, etc. (1998)
 Monsieur Ibrahim (2003)
 A Common Thread (2004)
 The Army of Crime (2009)
 Brèves de comptoir (2014)
 Au fil d'Ariane [Ariane's Thread] (2014)
 Casanova Variations (2014)
 Don't Tell Me the Boy Was Mad (2015)
 Gloria Mundi (2019)
 Le Tigre et le Président (2022)

References

Bibliography
 Janis L. Pallister & Ruth A. Hottell. Noteworthy Francophone Women Directors: A Sequel. Lexington Books, 2011.

External links

1987 births
Living people
French film actresses
French stage actresses
French television actresses
Actresses from Paris
20th-century French actresses
21st-century French actresses